Prescott High School may refer to:

 Prescott High School (Arizona) in Prescott, Arizona
 Prescott High School (Arkansas) in Prescott, Arkansas
 Prescott High School (Wisconsin) in Prescott, Wisconsin